The 2008 Piala Belia is the first season of the Piala Belia. The league is currently the youth level (U19) football league in Malaysia.

Final

Champions

References

External links
 Football Association of Malaysia
 SPMB 

2008 in Malaysian football